Solène Barbance (born 13 August 1991) is a French footballer who plays as a midfielder for Rodez.

Career

Club career

Barbance started her career with French side Toulouse. In 2012, she signed for Peamount United in the Republic of Ireland, helping them win the 2013 WNL Cup. In 2015, she returned to French club Rodez.

International career

She represented France at the 2015 Summer Universiade and at the 2015 World Military Cup, helping them win both.

References

External links

 

1991 births
AS Muret players
ASPTT Albi players
Dijon FCO (women) players
Division 1 Féminine players
FC Girondins de Bordeaux (women) players
France women's youth international footballers
French women's footballers
Living people
Paris Saint-Germain Féminine players
Peamount United F.C. players
Rodez AF (women) players
Toulouse FC (women) players
Women's association football midfielders
Women's National League (Ireland) players
French expatriate sportspeople in Ireland
Expatriate women's association footballers in Ireland